The 2022–23 WRU Championship (or Admiral Championship for sponsorship reasons) is the tenth season of the WRU Championship, the second tier of club rugby in Wales run by the Welsh Rugby Union. It is to contested by 14 Welsh clubs.

Structure 
The structure reverts back to its traditional league format following truncation the previous season. Each team will play each other team on a home and away basis for a total of 26 games. League points are awarded as such – 4 points for a win, 2 for a draw and 0 for a loss. Teams can also earn an additional bonus point by scoring four or more tries in a match and/or losing by less than seven points. As the Premiership expands to 14 teams for the 2023-24 season, the top two clubs will be promoted - providing they meet the WRU A Licence criteria. No teams will be relegated.

Teams 
The same 14 teams from the 2021-22 season will compete this term. Bargoed are the reigning champions.

Standings

References

External links 
 

Welsh Championship
WRU Championship
Wales